The 1980 Vuelta a España was the 35th edition of the Vuelta a España, one of cycling's Grand Tours. The Vuelta began in La Manga, with a prologue individual time trial on 22 April, and Stage 11 occurred on 3 May with a stage from Santander. The race finished in Madrid on 11 May.

Stage 11
3 May 1980 — Santander to Gijón,

Stage 12
4 May 1980 — Santiago de Compostela to Pontevedra,

Stage 13
5 May 1980 — Pontevedra to Vigo,

Stage 14
6 May 1980 — Vigo to Ourense,

Stage 15
7 May 1980 — Ourense to Ponferrada,

Stage 16a
8 May 1980 — Ponferrada to León,

Stage 16b
8 May 1980 — León to León,  (ITT)

Stage 17
9 May 1980 — León to Valladolid,

Stage 18

Stage 19
11 May 1980 — Madrid to Madrid,

References

1980 Vuelta a España
Vuelta a España stages